The 327th Infantry Regiment (Bastogne Bulldogs) is an infantry regiment of the 101st Airborne Division (Air Assault) of the United States Army. During World War II, the 327th was a glider-borne regiment of the 101st Airborne Division. It fought during World War I as part of the 82nd Division. It has also been deployed in the Vietnam War, Gulf War, and most recently to Iraq and Afghanistan.  The song "Glider Rider" describes (humorously) some of the slights that glider-borne troops felt they received from the Army during World War II; though the regiment's public fame rose with the 1949 movie Battleground about the Siege of Bastogne in late 1944.

World War I 

In WWI the 327th Infantry Regiment served as part of the 164th Infantry Brigade in the 82nd Infantry Division. The 327th Infantry was organized on 15 September 1917 at Fort Gordon, Georgia. After training, the regiment embarked to northern France, arriving in early spring 1918. Elements of the 327th Infantry moved up to the front lines at the end of that summer. On 9 June 1918, Cpt Jewett Williams became the first man in the regiment killed in combat.

The 82nd Infantry Division's first exposure to combat, as a division, occurred on 25 June when it was assigned to the Lagney sector.  While this was earmarked as a quiet sector, the 327th actively patrolled and executed raids for several weeks.

Saint-Mihiel 

The 82nd Division was occupying the Marbache sector in the Moselle Valley with orders to protect the flank of attacking U.S. forces. But as the Germans were reinforcing this sector in anticipation of a coming Allied offensive, the Division ordered a series of raids to mislead the Germans on the exact location of attacking units.  The 327th Infantry, conducted a raid on a German strongpoint known as the Bel Air Farm on 13 September with 2 companies, E and K, as the assault force.  After initial success the assault group was pushed back to the original U.S. lines.  E & K companies suffered 6 dead, 11 severely wounded, 69 wounded and 10 missing. The 82nd continued operations in Saint-Mihiel until, on 17 September, it was relieved by troops of the 90th Infantry Division just west of the Moselle River.  The 82nd Division went into reserve to prepare for the Meuse-Argonne Offensive, but the 327th was attached to the 28th Division and remained on the front until early October.

Meuse-Argonne 
The 82nd Division was given a new axis of advance early in the Meuse-Argonne Offensive to attack and fill a gap to the left flank of the 28th Infantry Division which was advancing to capture Hill 223 as part of operations to rescue the 77th Infantry Division's Lost Battalion.  On the night of 6/7 October 1918, the regiment relieved troops on the left of the 28th Division on the Aire River. On 7 October, it attacked toward the Argonne Forest, making some progress toward Cornay. On 8 October rescuers reached the Lost Battalion.  The next day the 327th continued to attack towards the high ground northwest of Châtel-Chéhéry.  The 327th then continued to fight in the Ardennes region, capturing Conray and Hill 180.  On 4 November the regiment was pulled from the line and moved into training area; it was there when it learned of the 11 November Armistice.

The 327th Infantry suffered 331 killed in action, 73 died of wounds and 1959 wounded in the First World War. Members of the 327th were awarded 7 Distinguished Services Crosses (DSC), including one for the 2-327th Commander-Lt Col Harold W. Blanchard.

World War II

Normandy 
Part of the 82nd Infantry Division was transferred to the 101st Airborne Division on 15 August 1942. All equipment and personnel assigned to the regiment were designed to be carried in the Waco CG-4A glider.  Although a glider infantry regiment, the majority of the unit landed by sea on Utah Beach in the afternoon of 7 June 1944, because of a shortage of planes to tow its gliders. Some elements did reach shore on D-Day, 6 June, but because of rough seas, beach traffic, and the fact that the paratroopers of the 101st had already achieved many of their objectives, the landing was delayed.  The 327th suffered a few casualties going ashore from enemy fire and were strafed by enemy aircraft.  Near Saint-Côme-du-Mont (southeast of the village), the 327th was camped right next to German paratroopers, separated by thick hedgerows.  German-speaking soldiers in the 327th engaged in taunting the enemy.  The 327th took several casualties by enemy mortars. By 8 June, the 327th had entered the front line, largely in reserve of the 506th until crossing the Douve River near Carentan.  First and Second Battalions guarded Utah Beachhead's left flank northeast of Carentan. Company C was hit hard by friendly fire mortars while crossing the Douve. Official findings blamed enemy mines. Company B also suffered casualties in the incident.

The 327th suffered heavy casualties while advancing on Carentan via what is now the city Marina from a northeast direction and other casualties approaching Carentan from the east.  G Company led the attack on the west bank of the marina canal.  A Company of the attached 401st Glider Infantry Regiment was on the east bank of the canal.  Concealed German machine guns and mortars inflicted the most casualties.  Chaplain Gordon Cosby earned a Silver Star for bravery in the face of the enemy for assisting wounded glider men in front of heavily armed German soldiers.  The 327th played a pivotal role with the 501st and 506th of the 101st in taking Carentan.  The 327th marched through the town and East to be possibly the first unit of the Utah Beachhead to link up with the Omaha Beachhead around the four-villages area of le Fourchette, le Mesnil, le Rocher and Cotz.  It was then directed South between the bulk of the 101st and the 75th Infantry Division of the Omaha Beachhead.

The unit was commanded by Col. George S. Wear through 10 June, when command was turned over to Col. Joseph H. Harper.  Although not official, the men of the 327th understood that Wear was replaced because of friendly-fire artillery casualties while crossing the Douve River.  Officially, enemy mortars were blamed.

The Netherlands 
The regiment played a pivotal role in Operation Market Garden battle near Best, in the Netherlands, encircling a large German force which had been pressured from the west by the tank-supported 502nd of the 101st.  Sgt. Manuel Hidalgo and Lt. Hibbard of G Company risked their lives in a humanitarian effort to get the enemy to surrender before being annihilated by the 327th.  In the Market Garden operations, some companies in the 327th suffered two-thirds casualty rates before arriving at Opheusden. 2nd Battalion, especially Company G, suffered heavy casualties from a brutal shelling in the churchyard at Veghel.  The large artillery shells were launched from the Erp vicinity.  Dutch collaborators aided German scouts and were executed by the Dutch underground after the shelling.

At Opheusden, the 327th withstood repeated assaults by the enemy and heavy artillery barrages.  In Rendezvous with Destiny, Rapport and Arthur cite British officers that indicated that the barrage suffered by the 327 was as intense as anything they had seen, and rivaled what the British pummeled the Germans with at El Alamein in North Africa. The fighting along the west and northwest perimeter in the Ophuesden (the Island) area was as intense as any fighting in the area.  E Company engaged in hand-to-hand combat with the enemy near the railroad track switch house south of Opheusden. The enemy repeatedly hurled their units unsuccessfully at the glider men and suffered high casualties.

Bastogne 

At Bastogne, Belgium, the 327 held half of the perimeter (including the 401, which was acting as the Regiment's 3rd Battalion and later officially became a part of the 327).  Numerous intense fights erupted along the 327 sector including two brutal fights at Marvie and more to the west in the 401 section. The Germans attacking were of the Volksgrenadiers and the elite tank-based Panzer Lehr. At Marvie the 327 was outnumbered by 15 to 1.  Facing only two US companies, G Company, supported by several tanks from the 10th Armored Division and E Company in reserve, the German commander took his whole division further west.  At Marvie, the Germans lost six tanks and several half tracks.  One tank did break into Marvie, but was destroyed trying to make a run towards Bastogne.  Several days later, during the night of 23 December, the enemy attacked in force with tanks.  The road through Marvie was blocked when G Company mistook a US tank destroyer for a German tank and destroyed it on the village bridge.  The Germans overran Hill 500 just to the west of Marvie and broke through the gap between F and G Company.  The enemy then put rear pressure on the F Company Command Post.  A platoon sized paratrooper element came to support F Company.  The German forces managed to place tanks behind US lines between Marvie and Bastogne.  The glider men of Company G and Company F were pushed back from 500 to 1,000 yards during the intense fighting, but did not break. Unable to make quick progress, the Germans pressed the attack until morning, but withdrew when the German Command Center was destroyed by US artillery.  Again, the 327 was badly outnumbered by the enemy.

After the break through by General Patton's tanks, the 327th proceeded to the north sector of the Bastogne theater of operations. There, 2nd Battalion was involved in clearing Champs after a German armored element broke through paratrooper lines.  Companies A and C suffered intense casualties and were consolidated into one company call ACE.  Later, the 327 made an open field maneuver against armored enemy troops east of Foy, which helped secure that village.  The ferocity and speed of the open-field attack surprised the Germans and the paratrooper regiments on the flanks of the attack.  German forces attacked the flank and surrounded ACE Company in Bois Jacques.  After that, the enemy was primarily in withdrawal mode back to Germany.

The 327 often is slighted by fans of the 101st Airborne Division as riding in a glider is not deemed as perilous as parachuting in battle.  Several companies of the 327 suffered casualty rates as high or higher than many paratrooper regiments.  Some companies, such as A, C, and G, and the 401st took casualties as severe as the most engaged paratrooper regiments.  On D+2, glider flights into Market Garden suffered a 30% loss of gliders. Later, the 327 was involved in action near Hagenau, France in Alsace.

Post WWII 
Inactivated on 30 November 1945 in France, the regiment was redesignated as the 516th Airborne Infantry Regiment on 18 June 1948 and active from 6 July 1948 to 1 April 1949 and from 25 August 1950 to 1 December 1953 at Camp Breckinridge, Kentucky.  As was the case with many combat divisions of World War II fame, the colors of the 101st Airborne Division and its subordinate elements were active only as training units and were not organized as parachute or glider units.

On 27 April 1954 the 516th was relieved from assignment to the 101st Airborne Division and activated at Fort Jackson, South Carolina, on 15 May 1954, again as a training unit. On 1 July 1956 it was reorganized and redesignated as the 327th Airborne Infantry Regiment, an element of the 101st. On 25 April 1957 the colors of Company A, 327AIR were reorganized and redesignated as HHC, 1st Airborne Battle Group, 327th Infantry, and remained assigned to the 101st Airborne Division (organic elements concurrently constituted and activated).  This was the only active element of the 327th Infantry during the Pentomic era.  When the Army abandoned battle groups for brigades and battalions, the unit was reorganized and redesignated on 3 February 1963 as the 1st Battalion, 327th Infantry, an element of the 1st Brigade, 101st Airborne Division.

On 21 January 1964 the lineage of the former Company B, 327AIR was redesignated as HHC, 2d Battalion, 327th Infantry, assigned to the 101st Airborne Division (organic elements concurrently constituted) and activated on 3 February 1963, also as an element of the 1st Brigade, 101st Airborne Division.

Vietnam 
As elements of the 1st Brigade, the 1st and 2nd Battalions 327th Infantry deployed to South Vietnam on 29 July 1965, where they were joined by the rest of the division in late 1967.

In November 1965 Major David Hackworth organized Tiger Force a platoon-sized long-range reconnaissance patrol unit within the 1st Battalion. Tiger Force was later accused of extensive war crimes against South Vietnamese civilians.

In October 1968 the 1st Battalion was awarded the Presidential Unit Citation by President Lyndon B. Johnson.

On 28 November 1971 a CH-47 carrying five crew and 28 soldiers from the Regiment on a flight from Da Nang to Phu Bai Combat Base crashed into high ground, killing all aboard.

The 2nd Battalion was the last unit of the 101st Airborne to leave Vietnam, departing in April 1972, making it the longest serving unit in combat during the Vietnam War.

Post-war reorganization 

During the early 1980s the army adopted a battalion rotation program that paired combat battalions based in the continental United States with those stationed overseas. As part of this program, the lineage of the former Company C, 327AIR was redesignated on 21 January 1983 as HHC, 3d Battalion, 327th Infantry, and assigned to the 1st Brigade, 101st Airborne Division (Air Assault). This was accomplished by reflagging the existing 2nd Battalion, 502nd Infantry. In Alaska the existing infantry battalions of the 172nd Infantry Brigade were reflagged as the 4th, 5th and 6th Battalions, 327th Infantry, with the three "C" companies' back on airborne status, thus reactivating the lineages of the former companies D, E, and F, 327AIR.  The rotational program was later abandoned and the Alaska-based battalions were reflagged again, leaving only the Fort Campbell-based battalions with 327th designations.

When the 172nd Infantry Brigade (Separate) was inactivated and replaced by the newly re-activated 6th Infantry Division (Light) in 1986; the 4th, 5th and 6th Battalions, 327th Infantry were also inactivated and replaced by the 1st and 2nd Battalion, 17th Infantry (Fort Richardson, AK); and the 4th and 5th Battalion, 9th Infantry (Fort Wainwright, AK).

Operation Desert Storm 
In 1990 the 1st BCT (including the 1st, 2nd and 3rd Battalions of the 327th) was deployed to Saudi Arabia during Operation Desert Shield. On 17 January the 327th Infantry Regiment conducted a ground movement to Camp Eagle II in preparation for deployment into Iraq. Over the course of the next week the regiment regrouped and by C-130 and ground convey repositioned to RaFa in northern Saudi Arabia and further into TAA Campbell where it remained for approximately 30 days. With the commencement of ground operations, under the command of Colonel Tom Hill the 327th conducted the deepest and largest air assault operation in history establishing FOB Cobra approximately  inside Iraq. Subordinate elements were 1st Battalion, 327th Infantry Battalion commanded by LTC Frank R. Hancock, 2nd Battalion, 327th commanded by LTC Charles Garey Thomas, 3rd Battalion 327th commanded by LTC (P) Gary J. Bridges and 1st Battalion 502nd commanded by LTC Jim Donald. 2nd Battalion 320 FA artillery was commanded by LTC Lynn Hartsell. The 3rd Battalion, 327th Infantry Regiment conducted a second air assault operation to seize FOB White under the command of 2nd Brigade 101st Airborne Division for further seal the defeat of Iraqi forces. Not a single 101st Airborne Division soldier was lost.

Operation Iraqi Freedom 
In early 2003 the entire 101st Airborne Division deployed to Kuwait in support of Operation Iraqi Freedom where the 1st Brigade Combat Team made up of the 327th Infantry Regiment under the command of Colonel Ben Hodges and its support elements prepared for battle at Camp Pennsylvania. The majority of the 327th Infantry Regiment later shifted to Camp Udairi, Kuwait and from there, conducted a massive air assault into southern Iraq while other soldiers crossed the Kuwaiti-Iraqi border in a massive maneuver known as a GAC, or Ground Assault Convoy. Once in Iraq, the 327th encountered heavy to light resistance from both fleeing Iraqi soldiers as well as the Fedayeen Saddam and other less organized fighters. The 327th, under LTC Edmund Palekas, fought through An Najaf, Al Kufa, Karbala, Baghdad, and then headed north to conduct Stability and Security Operations in Qayyarah West and Mosul or Al Mawsil.

They returned to the U.S. in early 2004 and were re-deployed to Iraq again in the fall of 2005. During their second tour in Iraq, they were stationed in the Kirkuk province under the command of LTC Marc Hutson and CSM David Allard. The majority of the 1st Brigade Combat Team were positioned on FOB Warrior at the Kirkuk Regional Air Base while 1st Battalion and other attachments were spread out amongst FOB McHenry outside of Hawijah, FOB Caldwell just south of Kirkuk, and FOB Bernstien southwest of Kirkuk.

For their third OIF deployment, the Bastogne Bulldogs were split up, with the 1st Battalion deployed near Baiji, Iraq, and the 2nd Battalion deployed in the vicinity of Samarra, Iraq. Both battalions served 15 month deployments beginning in September 2007, and ending in late November 2008.

Modularity 
With the recent Army-wide reorganization adding one brigade to each division and eliminating one infantry or armor battalion from each brigade, 3-327th was inactivated and replaced by the 1st Squadron (RSTA), 32nd Cavalry Regiment.  The 1st Brigade Combat Team, 101st Airborne Division (Air Assault) also includes the 1st Battalion, 506th Infantry regiment; 2nd Battalion, 320th Field Artillery Regiment; the 426th Brigade Support Battalion; and the 326th Brigade Engineer Battalion.

War in Afghanistan (2001–2014) 

The 2nd Battalion, 327th Infantry Regiment, 101st Airborne Division conducted a major combat operation in Barawala Kalay Valley, Kunar Province, Afghanistan in late March–April 2011. It is known as the Battle of Barawala Kalay Valley. It was an operation to close down the Taliban supply route through the Barawala Kalay Valley and to remove the forces of Taliban warlord Qari Ziaur Rahman from the Barwala Kalay Valley. The 2nd Battalion, 327th Infantry Regiment, 101st Airborne Division would suffer 6 killed and 7 wounded during combat operations. It would inflict over 100 casualties on the Taliban and successfully close down the Taliban supply route. ABC News correspondent Mike Boettcher was on scene and he called it the fiercest fighting he has ever seen in his 30 years of being in war zones.

Lineage 
 Constituted 5 August 1917 in the National Army as the 327th Infantry and assigned to the 82d Division
 Organized 17 September 1917 at Camp Gordon, at Augusta, Georgia.
 Demobilized 26 May 1919 at Camp Upton, at Yaphank, New York.
 Reconstituted 24 June 1921 in the Organized Reserves as the 327th Infantry and assigned to the 82d Division
 Organized in December 1921 with headquarters at Greenville, South Carolina.
 Ordered into active military service 25 March 1942 and reorganized at Camp Claiborne, at Forest Hill, Louisiana.
 Reorganized and redesignated 15 August 1942 as the 327th Glider Infantry; concurrently relieved from assignment to the 82d Division and assigned to the 101st Airborne Division
 (3d Battalion consolidated 6 April 1945 with the 1st Battalion, 401st Glider Infantry [see ANNEX], and consolidated unit designated as the 3d Battalion, 327th Glider Infantry)
 Inactivated 30 November 1945 in France
 (Organized Reserves redesignated 25 March 1948 as the Organized Reserve Corps)
 Redesignated 18 June 1948 as the 516th Airborne Infantry
 Withdrawn 25 June 1948 from the Organized Reserve Corps and allotted to the Regular Army
 (1st Battalion inactivated 1 April 1949 at Camp Breckinridge, at Morganfield, Kentucky)
 Regiment (less 1st Battalion) inactivated 22 April 1949 at Camp Breckinridge, Kentucky
 Regiment activated 25 August 1950 at Camp Breckinridge, Kentucky
 Inactivated 1 December 1953 at Camp Breckinridge, Kentucky
 Relieved 27 April 1954 from assignment to the 101st Airborne Division
 Activated 15 May 1954 at Fort Jackson, at Columbia, South Carolina.
 Reorganized and redesignated 1 July 1956 as the 327th Airborne Infantry and assigned to the 101st Airborne Division
 Relieved 25 April 1957 from assignment to the 101st Airborne Division; concurrently reorganized and redesignated as the 327th Infantry, a parent regiment under the U.S. Army Combat Arms Regimental System
 Withdrawn 21 January 1983 from the Combat Arms Regimental System and reorganized under the United States Army Regimental System

401st Infantry 
During the early part of World War II, after the formation of the division, the 101st had two two-battalion glider regiments, one of which was the 401st. When the TO&E for airborne divisions was changed to encompass a single three-battalion glider regiment, the 2nd Battalion of the 401st was transferred to the 82nd Airborne Division and the 1st Battalion of the 401st Glider Infantry Regiment served as the third battalion of the 327th GIR. This battalion was sea-landed in the Normandy invasion, glider-landed during Operation Market Garden and moved by truck to participate in the Battle of the Bulge.
 Constituted 23 July 1918 in the National Army as the 1st Battalion, 401st Infantry, an element of the 101st Division
 Demobilized 30 November 1918
 Reconstituted 24 June 1921 in the Organized Reserves as the 1st Battalion, 401st Infantry, an element of the 101st Division
 Organized in November 1921 with headquarters at Milwaukee, Wisconsin.
 Disbanded 15 August 1942; concurrently reconstituted in the Army of the United States as the 1st Battalion, 401st Glider Infantry, an element of the 101st Airborne Division, and activated at Camp Claiborne, Louisiana
 Disbanded 1 March 1945 in France and the personnel and equipment designated and constituted as the 3rd Battalion, 327th Glider Infantry.
 Reconstituted 6 April 1945 in the Army of the United States as the 1st Battalion, 401st Glider Infantry; concurrently consolidated with the 3d Battalion, 327th Glider Infantry, and consolidated unit designated as the 3d Battalion, 327th Glider Infantry, an element of the 101st Airborne Division

Honors

Campaign participation credit 
 World War I

 Saint-Mihiel;
 Meuse-Argonne;
 Lorraine 1918
 World War II:

 Normandy (with arrowhead);
 Rhineland (with arrowhead);
 Ardennes-Alsace;
 Central Europe
 Vietnam War:

 Defense;
 Counteroffensive;
 Counteroffensive, Phase II;
 Counteroffensive, Phase III;
 Tet Counteroffensive;
 Counteroffensive, Phase IV;
 Counteroffensive, Phase V;
 Counteroffensive, Phase VI;
 Tet 69/Counteroffensive;
 Summer-Fall 1969;
 Winter-Spring 1970;
 Sanctuary Counteroffensive;
 Counteroffensive, Phase VII;
 Consolidation I;# Iraq Surge
 Afghanistan Consolidation III
 Consolidation II;
 Cease-Fire
 Southwest Asia Operation Desert Storm:

 Defense of Saudi Arabia;
 Liberation and Defense of Kuwait
 War on Terror:

 Iraq Surge;
 Afghanistan Consolidation III

Additional campaigns to be determined

Decorations 
 Presidential Unit Citation (Army) for BASTOGNE
 Presidential Unit Citation (Army) for DAK TO, VIETNAM 1966
 Presidential Unit Citation (Army) for TRUNG LUONG
 Valorous Unit Award for TUY HOA
 Valorous Unit Award for SOUTHWEST ASIA
 Valorous Unit Award for IRAQ (An Najaf 2003)
 Meritorious Unit Commendation (Army) for VIETNAM 1965–1966
 Meritorious Unit Commendation (Army) for SOUTHWEST ASIA
 Meritorious Unit Commendation (Army) for IRAQ (OIF I)
 Meritorious Unit Commendation (Army) for IRAQ (OIF VI October 2008 – November 2009)
 Meritorious Unit Commendation (Army) for AFGHANISTAN (OEF 10–11)
 French Croix de Guerre with Palm, World War II for NORMANDY
 Belgium Croix de Guerre with Palm for BASTOGNE; cited in the Order of the Day of the Belgian Army for action at BASTOGNE
 Belgian Fourragere 1940; Cited in the Order of the Day of the Belgian Army for action in FRANCE AND BELGIUM

References

External links 
 
 https://history.army.mil/books/wwi/ob/82-comp-ob.htm.  "82nd Division Composition (World War I)". United States Army Center of Military History. Retrieved 4 February 2018.
 https://www.327infantry.org/wp-content/uploads/2016/04/327th_Roster.pdf  327th Infantry Regiment, 1917–1919 viewed 5 February 2018
 Lost Battalion (World War I) the lost Battalion viewed February 2018
 https://history.army.mil/html/forcestruc/lineages/branches/inf/0327in.htm retrieved 6 February 1918

327
101st Airborne Division
Military units and formations established in 1917